The 2017–18 Premier League of Belize was the seventh season of the highest competitive football league in Belize, after it was founded in 2011. There were two seasons which were spread over two years. The opening was played towards the end of 2017 and the closing was played at the beginning of 2018.

Team information

Opening season

From the 2016–17 Premier League of Belize closing season, 7 teams continued to play in the opening season of 2017–18. FC Belize were replaced by a newly formed team, San Pedro Pirates, making 8 teams in total.

There would be one league consisting of the 8 teams, who will play each other twice, with the top 4 teams advancing to the end of season playoffs. The opening season commenced on 12 August 2017.

League table

Results

Playoffs

Semi-finals 

Game One

Game Two

Finals 

Game One

Game Two

Season statistics

Top scorers

 Includes playoff goals.

Hat-tricks

4 Player scored 4 goals 
5 Player scored 5 goals

Awards

In the post-game ceremonies of the final game of the season, the individual awards were announced.

Closing season

All 8 teams that participated in the opening season will participate in the closing season.

The format will be the same as the opening season with one league consisting of the 8 teams, who will play each other twice, with the top 4 teams advancing to the end of season playoffs. The closing season commenced on 13 January 2018.

League table

Results

Playoffs

Semi-finals 

Game One

Game Two

Finals 

Game One

Game Two

Season statistics

Top scorers

 Includes playoff goals.

Hat-tricks

Awards

In the post-game ceremonies of the final game of the season, the individual awards were announced.

Aggregate table

References

Top level Belizean football league seasons
1
Bel